Hands Without Shadows is the fifth studio album by American shred guitarist Michael Angelo Batio. The album consists of four covers, two 'tributes' and two original compositions by Batio. The name refers to the speed at which his hands move when playing guitar, leaving "no shadows".

Batio has said that he wanted the album to be "cohesive" and have "a central theme, sound and continuous atmosphere from beginning to end". He has also said that Hands Without Shadows is "[his] uncompromising vision".

Track listing

Credits

 Michael Angelo Batio – lead guitar, rhythm guitars, keyboards, production, arrangements
 William Kopecky – five-string bass, fretless bass
 Bobby Rock – drums
 Mark Tremonti – guitar solo on "Burn"
 Bill Peck – guitar solo on "Zeppelin Forever"
 Doug Marks – guitar solo on "Zeppelin Forever"
 Stuart Bull – guitar solo and jamming on "All Along the Watchtower"
 Rudy Sarzo – bass on "Tribute to Randy"
 Chris Djuricic – engineering, mixing
 Trevor Sadler – mastering
 Stephen Jensen – art direction and design
 Dan Machnik – photography
 Dean Zelinsky – executive production
 Elliot Rubinson – executive production

References

External links
 Hands Without Shadows on Guitar Nine Records 

Michael Angelo Batio albums
2005 albums